Naser Mohammadkhani (born 7 September 1957) is a retired Iranian football striker. He also worked as a coach for Tehran's Persepolis club.

Honours

Club
Persepolis
Asian Cup Winners' Cup (1): 1990–91
Runner-up: 1992–93
Hazfi Cup (1): 1991–92
Tehran Province League (3): 1982–83, 1989–90, 1990–91
Tehran Hazfi Cup (1): 1981-82

Qatar SC
Qatari Sheikh Jassim Cup (1): 1987

National
Iran
Asian Games Gold Medal (1): 1990

Individual
Top Goal Scorer 1984 AFC Asian Cup

Personal life
Mohammadkhani was involved in a public court case in Iran, after his wife Laleh Saharkhizan was found murdered in her apartment on 9 October 2002. Shahla Jahed, his mistress in a temporary marriage arrangement was convicted of the murder of Laleh. Mohammadkhani was in Germany when the killing happened, but it emerged later that he was "temporarily married" to Jahed, a practice allowed under Shia Islam and thus under Iranian law. Jahed was executed in 2010, following the completion of the appeals procedure.  In 2008, the then chief of Iran's judiciary, Mahmoud Hashemi Shahroudi, ordered a fresh investigation and did not sanction her execution ruling that her initial conviction (based as it was on a confession she made under duress) was unacceptable.

References

External links

1957 births
Living people
Iranian footballers
Iran international footballers
Association football forwards
rah Ahan players
Persepolis F.C. players
Qatar SC players
Iranian expatriate footballers
Asian Games gold medalists for Iran
1984 AFC Asian Cup players
Asian Games medalists in football
Footballers at the 1986 Asian Games
Footballers at the 1990 Asian Games
Qatar Stars League players
Medalists at the 1990 Asian Games